The Russian Bandy Super League, is a men's professional bandy league in Russia, the top division of Russian bandy.

There is no definite rule which teams will be relegated or promoted. Besides results on the ice, financial resources and infrastructure also play a part in the decisions. For example, the 2016–17 Russian Bandy Super League contained twelve teams. The 2017-18 season was to have fourteen. Stroitel won the Supreme League final tournament in 2017 and got promoted, while Zorky finished third in its group and did not even qualify for the final tournament. Still Zorky also got promoted. The Russian Bandy Federation banned coach Igor Gapanovich of Vodnik Arkhangelsk and coach Evgeny Erakhtin of Baykal-Energiya each for 30 months in March 2017, and fined each club 300,000 rubles (£4,100/$5,100/€4,800) for the teams scoring an aggregate of 20 goals in their own nets rather than their opponent’s to ensure they played against a convenient team in upcoming play-offs.

The Russian Bandy League was established in 1992 and has been reorganized as the Bandy Super League since the 2011–12 season. The regular league is followed by a play-off, where the final decides which team will become the Russian bandy champion.

Season structure
The season starts with a regular season comprising twelve teams. The first eight teams qualify for the second round, which is played as a single-elminination play-off round with quarter-finals, semi-finals and a final. The final is played on neutral ice. The final winner becomes Russian Champion.

Current teams
The teams playing in the Russian Super League for the 2021–22 season are the following:

Champions by season

 1992 – Zorky (Krasnogorsk)
 1993 – Zorky (Krasnogorsk)
 1994 – SKA-Sverdlovsk (Yekaterinburg)
 1995 – Sibselmash (Novosibirsk)
 1996 – Vodnik (Arkhangelsk)
 1997 – Vodnik (Arkhangelsk)
 1998 – Vodnik (Arkhangelsk)
 1999 – Vodnik (Arkhangelsk)
 2000 – Vodnik (Arkhangelsk)
 2001 – Yenisey (Krasnoyarsk)
 2002 – Vodnik (Arkhangelsk)
 2003 – Vodnik (Arkhangelsk)
 2004 – Vodnik (Arkhangelsk)
 2005 – Vodnik (Arkhangelsk)
 2006 – Dynamo (Moscow)
 2007 – Dynamo (Moscow)
 2008 – Dynamo (Moscow)
 2009 – Dynamo (Moscow)
 2010 – Dynamo (Moscow)
 2011 – Dynamo-Kazan
 2012 – Dynamo (Moscow)
 2013 – Dynamo (Moscow)
 2014 – Yenisey (Krasnoyarsk)
 2015 – Yenisey (Krasnoyarsk)
 2016 – Yenisey (Krasnoyarsk)
 2017 – SKA-Neftyanik (Khabarovsk)
 2018 – SKA-Neftyanik (Khabarovsk)
 2019 – SKA-Neftyanik (Khabarovsk)
 2020 – Dynamo (Moscow) / SKA-Neftyanik (Khabarovsk)
 2021 – Yenisey (Krasnoyarsk)
 2022 – Dynamo (Moscow)

References

External links
Official website
Russian Super League at Pribalt.info
 "Professional Bandy News Podcast"*

 
Bandy leagues in Russia
National bandy leagues
Russia
Professional sports leagues in Russia